Dolna Banya Airport  is a public use airport located 2 nautical miles east of Dolna Banya, Sofiya, Bulgaria and is the first private-owned airfield in Bulgaria. The airport features one single runway. One large hangar, together with an operations room, briefing room and other facilities. One smaller hangar, three concrete/asphalt taxiways a main and a smaller apron and a refuelling station.

The airfield is mainly used for general aviation and private flights. It can be said that it is one of the most active GA airfields in Bulgaria. LBDB airport is also the home base of RATAN Flight School - an organization co-owned by the airport's operator.

See also
List of airports in Bulgaria

References

External links 
 Airport record for Gara Kostenets Airport at Landings.com

Airports in Bulgaria
Sofia Province